Eucithara fasciata is a small sea snail, a marine gastropod mollusc in the family Mangeliidae.

R.J. Kilburn (1992) could not find sufficient grounds to distinguish Mangelia fasciata (Gray in Reeve (1846) from Eucithara vittata (Hinds, 1843)

Description
The length of the shell attains 8.5 mm.

The ribs are latticed with conspicuous transverse striae. The shell is yellowish white, with a central, narrow, chestnut band.>

Distribution
This marine species occurs off Madagascar and the Andaman and Nicobar Islands .

References

 Reeve, L.A. 1846. Monograph of the genus Mangelia. pls 1–8 in Reeve, L.A. (ed). Conchologia Iconica. London : L. Reeve & Co. Vol. 3.

External links
  Tucker, J.K. 2004 Catalog of recent and fossil turrids (Mollusca: Gastropoda). Zootaxa 682:1-1295
 
 Discover Life: Eucithara fasciata

fasciata
Gastropods described in 1846